Seweryn may refer to:

 Seweryn Berson (1858–1917), Polish lawyer and composer
 Seweryn Bialer (born 1926), emeritus professor of political science at Columbia University, expert on the Communist parties of the Soviet Union and Poland
 Seweryn Bieszczad (1852–1923), Polish painter
 Seweryn Chajtman (1919–2012), Polish scientist, engineer, teacher, pioneered Computer Science in Poland
 Seweryn Chomet (1930–2009), was a physicist, author, journalist, historian, publisher, translator of Russian scientific journals
 Seweryn Franciszek Czetwertyński-Światopełk (1873–1945), Polish landowner and politician
 Seweryn Gancarczyk (born 1981), professional Polish football player
 Seweryn Goszczyński (1801–1876), Polish Romantic prose writer and poet
 Seweryn Kiełpin (born 1987), Polish footballer
 Seweryn Klosowski (1865–1903), Polish serial killer known as the Borough Poisoner
 Seweryn Krajewski (born 1947), Polish singer and songwriter
 Seweryn Kulesza (1900–1983), Polish horse rider
 Seweryn Michalski (born 1994), Polish footballer
 Seweryn Ozdowski OAM FAICD (born 1949), human rights advocate and Human Rights Commissioner and Disability Discrimination Commissioner for the Australian government
 Seweryn Rzewuski (1743–1811), Polish nobleman, Field Hetman of the Crown, general of the Royal Army, a leader of the Confederation of Targowica
 Wacław Seweryn Rzewuski (1784–1831), Polish explorer, poet, orientalist and horse expert
 Andrzej Seweryn (born 1946), Polish and French actor and director
 Damian Seweryn (born 1979), Polish footballer
 Marek Seweryn (born 1957), Polish weightlifter
 Wojciech Seweryn (1939–2010), Polish-born sculptor and longtime resident of the United States
 Seweryn Wysłouch (1900–1968), legal historian and vice-rector of Wrocław University

See also
 Sewerynowo
 Sewerynów (disambiguation)
 Severyn

Polish masculine given names